Francesco Dell'Uomo (born 8 January 1987 in Colleferro) is an Italian diver.

In the 10 metre platform event he finished ninth at the 2004 Olympic Games and won the bronze medal at the 2008 European Aquatics Championships. At the 2006 European Aquatics Championships he won a bronze medal in the 10 m Platform Synchro event.

References

1987 births
Living people
People from Colleferro
Italian male divers
Divers at the 2004 Summer Olympics
Divers at the 2008 Summer Olympics
Divers at the 2012 Summer Olympics
Olympic divers of Italy
Divers of Fiamme Oro
Sportspeople from the Metropolitan City of Rome Capital
20th-century Italian people
21st-century Italian people